Guangdong Investment Limited is a Chinese company incorporated in Hong Kong. It is engaged in the businesses of property, infrastructure, energy, water supply to Hong Kong, Shenzhen and Dongguan, hotel management and department store operations.

Guangdong Investment is a constituent of Hang Seng China-Affiliated Corporations Index (red chip index).

The parent company was Guangdong Holdings (held the stake via GDH Limited and Guangdong Trust) Guangdong Holdings is a wholly owned subsidiary of Guangdong Provincial People's Government.

History
 was incorporated on 5 January 1973 in Hong Kong. On 12 July 1988 it was renamed into Guangdong Investment Limited, which the listed company was acquired by Guangdong Enterprises: a "window company" of mainland China in the British colony. Since that year Guangdong Investment became a special purpose vehicle that Guangdong Enterprises backdoor listing its assets.

References

External links
 

Companies listed on the Hong Kong Stock Exchange
Companies owned by the provincial government of China
Former companies in the Hang Seng Index
Conglomerate companies of China
Companies based in Guangzhou
Chinese companies established in 1988